The Philips Sports Manager of the Year Awards for 2009 were held on Wednesday, 9 December at the Shelbourne Hotel, Dublin. Declan Kidney won the award for the second consecutive year after guiding Ireland to their first Six Nations Championship since 1985, and their first Grand Slam since 1948, following up with an unbeaten autumn season against Australia, Argentina and Fiji. Kidney had won the monthly award twice during the year.

Also honoured for their achievements in 2009 were Heineken Cup-winning coach with Leinster Rugby Michael Cheika, League of Ireland-winning manager Pat Fenlon, GAA managers Brian Cody, Jack O'Connor, Conor Counihan and Mick O'Dwyer, plus Ireland soccer manager Giovanni Trapattoni, whose side reached the FIFA World Cup play-offs, only to go out in controversial circumstances.

Philips Sports Manager of the Month 2009 Winners

References

Philips
2009 in Irish sport
2009 sports awards